Peter Still (February 22, 1801 –  January 10, 1868), was a former slave who achieved some renown by securing his own freedom in 1850 and subsequently collecting enough money to purchase the freedom of his wife and three children in 1854. His efforts were documented in the book: The kidnapped and the ransomed; being the personal recollections of Peter Still and his wife "Vina," after forty years of slavery, which his biographer Kate E. R. Pickard published in 1856.

Biography

Still was born a slave to parents Sidney and Levin on a plantation owned by Saunders Griffin on the Eastern Shore of Maryland. Peter and his eldest brother Levin Jr. were sold by their owner at ages eight and six respectively, shortly after their mother had fled for a second time. After many years in Kentucky, the brothers were eventually sold to various slave-owning families in Florence and Tuscumbia, Alabama. It was there that Peter met and married Lavinia (Vina) Sisson, a household slave from a nearby plantation, on June 25, 1826. Peter's brother Levin died in 1831, leaving Peter without a living tie to his family. Through a verbal arrangement with his last owners, Joseph and Isaac Friedman, Peter secured his manumission for $500 in April 1850. Shortly thereafter, Peter arrived in Philadelphia, where he serendipitously met his youngest brother William Still, then serving as a clerk at the Anti-Slavery Office. Through his own efforts, and those of his family, friends, and supporters, Peter was eventually reunited with his wife Vina and children Peter, Levin, and Catharine, in 1854. They resided in Burlington County, New Jersey until Peter died of pneumonia in 1868.

His brother James became a practicing doctor in southern New Jersey and was known as "The Black Doctor of the Pines." James also published a memoir, Early Recollections and Life of Dr. James Still, printed by J.B. Lippincott & Co. in 1877.

See also
Solomon Northup

References 

American freedmen
19th-century American slaves
1801 births
1869 deaths
People from Maryland
People from Burlington County, New Jersey
Deaths from pneumonia in New Jersey
Black slave owners in the United States